The River of Anyder is a jazz album by Italian pianist Stefano Battaglia and his trio, recorded in 2009 and released in 2011 on the ECM label.

Track listing
All compositions by Stefano Battaglia.

"Minas Tirith" - 7:32
"The River of Anyder" - 7:00
"Ararat Dance" - 8:48
"Return to Bensalem" - 7:40
"Nowhere Song" - 2:18
"Sham-bha-lah" - 15:00
"Bensalem" - 12:13
"Anagoor" - 11:07
"Ararat Prayer" - 6:20
"Anywhere Song" - 1:11

Personnel
Stefano Battaglia - piano
Salvatore Maiore - bass
Roberto Dani - drums

References

ECM Records albums
2011 albums
Albums produced by Manfred Eicher
Stefano Battaglia albums